The Spanish Olympic Committee (COE) is responsible body for Spain's participation in the Olympic Games. Members of the committee are 35 sports federations, which elect the Executive Council composed of the president and 23 members.

History

The Spanish Olympic Committee was founded on November 23, 1912, and refounded on January 11, 1924, in Barcelona.

Presidents

Executive committee
The committee of the COE is represented by:
 President: Alejandro Blanco Bravo
 Vice Presidents: Isabel Fernández Gutiérrez, Francisco Vidal Blázquez García, Isabel García Sanz, Marco Antonio Rioja Pérez
 Secretary General: Victoria Cabezas Alvarez 
 IOC Members: Pilar de Borbón, Marisol Casado Estupiñán, José Perurena López, Juan Antonio Samaranch Salisachs
 Treasurer: Víctor Gaspar Sánchez Naranjo 
 Members of Representatives of Olympic Sports Federations: Jesús Carballo Martínez, Jesús Castellanos Pueblas, Santiago Deó Valera, Luis Gonzaga Escauriaza Barreiro, José Hidalgo Martín, José Luis López Cerrón, José María Peus España, Francisco Javier Revuelta del Peral, Juan José Román Mangas
 Members of Representatives of Non-Olympic Sports Federations Manuel Aviñó Roger, Luis Vañó Martínez, Luis Angel Vegas Herrera
 Representative of Olympic Sport: Ignacio Sola Cortabarría

Member federations
The Spanish National Federations are the organizations that coordinate all aspects of their individual sports. They are responsible for training, competition and development of their sports. There are currently 33 Olympic Summer and two Winter Sport Federations in Spain.

See also
Spain at the Olympics

References

External links
Official website

National Olympic Committees
Comm
Oly
1912 establishments in Spain
Sports organizations established in 1912